The Israel Defense Forces (IDF;), alternatively referred to by the Hebrew-language acronym , is the national military of the State of Israel. It consists of three service branches: the Israeli Ground Forces, the Israeli Air Force, and the Israeli Navy. It is the sole military wing of the Israeli security apparatus, and has no civilian jurisdiction within Israel. The IDF is headed by the Chief of the General Staff, who is subordinate to the Israeli Defense Minister.

On the orders of David Ben-Gurion, the IDF was formed on 26 May 1948 and began to operate as a conscript military, drawing its initial recruits from the already-existing paramilitaries of the Yishuv—namely Haganah, the Irgun, and Lehi. Since its formation shortly after the Israeli Declaration of Independence, the IDF has participated in every armed conflict involving Israel. While it originally operated on three major fronts—against Lebanon and Syria in the north, against Jordan and Iraq in the east, and against Egypt in the south—the IDF has primarily shifted its focus to southern Lebanon and the Palestinian Territories since the 1979 Egypt–Israel peace treaty and 1994 Israel–Jordan peace treaty. However, notable Israeli–Syrian border incidents have occurred frequently since 2011 due to regional instability caused by the ongoing multi-sided Syrian Civil War.

The IDF is unique among the militaries of the world due to its regulated conscription of women since its formation. It is one of the most prominent institutions in Israeli society due to its influence on the country's economy and political scene. It uses several technologies developed within Israel, with many of them made specifically to cater to its needs in its operational environment in the Levant. Prominent Israeli-developed military equipment includes: the Merkava, a main battle tank; the Achzarit, an armored personnel carrier; Iron Dome, an air defense system; Trophy, an active protection system; the IMI Galil and IWI Tavor families of assault rifles; and the Uzi, a family of submachine guns. Since 1967, the IDF has had a close security relationship with the United States, including in research and development cooperation, with joint efforts on the F-15I, the Tactical High-Energy Laser, and the Arrow, among others.

The IDF is believed to have maintained an operational nuclear weapons capability since 1967, possibly possessing between 80 and 400 nuclear warheads; its nuclear-delivery system structure is widely suspected of having been successfully developed into a nuclear triad, primarily consisting of Jericho land-based intercontinental ballistic missiles, Popeye Turbo maritime-based submarine-launched cruise missiles, and various delivery-capable aircraft.

Etymology
The Israeli cabinet ratified the name "Israel Defense Forces", Tzva HaHagana LeYisra'el, literally "army for the defense of Israel," on 26 May 1948. The other main contender was Tzva Yisra'el. The name was chosen because it conveyed the idea that the army's role was defense, and because it incorporated the name Haganah, the pre-state defensive organization upon which the new army was based. Among the primary opponents of the name were Minister Haim-Moshe Shapira and the Hatzohar party, both in favor of Tzva Yisra'el.

History

The IDF traces its roots to Jewish paramilitary organizations in the New Yishuv, starting with the Second Aliyah (1904 to 1914). The first such organization was Bar-Giora, founded in September 1907. Bar-Giora was transformed into Hashomer in April 1909, which operated until the British Mandate of Palestine came into being in 1920. Hashomer was an elitist organization with narrow scope, and was mainly created to protect against criminal gangs seeking to steal property. The Zion Mule Corps and the Jewish Legion, both part of the British Army of World War I, would further bolster the Yishuv with military experience and manpower, forming the basis for later paramilitary forces. After the 1920 Palestine riots against Jews in April 1920, the Yishuv leadership realized the need for a nationwide underground defense organization, and the Haganah was founded in June of the same year. The Haganah became a full-scale defense force after the 1936–1939 Arab revolt in Palestine with an organized structure, consisting of three main units—the Field Corps, Guard Corps, and the Palmach. During World War II, the Yishuv participated in the British war effort, culminating in the formation of the Jewish Brigade. These would eventually form the backbone of the Israel Defense Forces, and provide it with its initial manpower and doctrine.

Following Israel's Declaration of Independence, Prime Minister and Defense Minister David Ben-Gurion issued an order for the formation of the Israel Defense Forces on 26 May 1948.  Although Ben-Gurion had no legal authority to issue such an order, the order was made legal by the cabinet on 31 May. The same order called for the disbandment of all other Jewish armed forces. The two other Jewish underground organizations, Irgun and Lehi, agreed to join the IDF if they would be able to form independent units and agreed not to make independent arms purchases. This was the background for the Altalena Affair, a confrontation surrounding weapons purchased by the Irgun resulting in a standoff between Irgun members and the newly created IDF. The affair came to an end when Altalena, the ship carrying the arms, was shelled by the IDF. Following the affair, all independent Irgun and Lehi units were either disbanded or merged into the IDF. The Palmach, a leading component of the Haganah, also joined the IDF with provisions, and Ben Gurion responded by disbanding its staff in 1949, after which many senior Palmach officers retired, notably its first commander, Yitzhak Sadeh.

The new army organized itself when the 1947–48 Civil War in Mandatory Palestine escalated into the 1948 Arab–Israeli War, which saw neighboring Arab states attack. Twelve infantry and armored brigades formed: Golani, Carmeli, Alexandroni, Kiryati, Givati, Etzioni, the 7th, and 8th armored brigades, Oded, Harel, Yiftach, and Negev. After the war, some of the brigades were converted to reserve units, and others were disbanded. Directorates and corps were created from corps and services in the Haganah, and this basic structure in the IDF still exists today.

Immediately after the 1948 war, the Israel-Palestinian conflict shifted to a low intensity conflict between the IDF and Palestinian fedayeen. In the 1956 Suez Crisis, the IDF's first serious test of strength after 1949, the new army captured the Sinai Peninsula from Egypt, which was later returned. In the 1967 Six-Day War, Israel conquered the Sinai Peninsula, Gaza Strip, West Bank (including East Jerusalem) and Golan Heights from the surrounding Arab states, changing the balance of power in the region as well as the role of the IDF. In the following years leading up to the Yom Kippur War, the IDF fought in the War of Attrition against Egypt in the Sinai and a border war against the Palestine Liberation Organization (PLO) in Jordan, culminating in the Battle of Karameh.

The surprise of the Yom Kippur War and its aftermath completely changed the IDF's procedures and approach to warfare. Organizational changes were made and more time was dedicated to training for conventional warfare. However, in the following years the army's role slowly shifted again to low-intensity conflict, urban warfare and counter-terrorism. An example of the latter was the successful 1976 Operation Entebbe commando raid to free hijacked airline passengers being held captive in Uganda. During this era, the IDF also mounted a successful bombing mission in Iraq to destroy its nuclear reactor. It was involved in the Lebanese Civil War, initiating Operation Litani and later the 1982 Lebanon War, where the IDF ousted Palestinian guerrilla organizations from Lebanon. For twenty-five years the IDF maintained a security zone inside South Lebanon with their allies the South Lebanon Army. Palestinian militancy has been the main focus of the IDF ever since, especially during the First and Second Intifadas, Operation Defensive Shield, the Gaza War, Operation Pillar of Defense, Operation Protective Edge, and Operation Guardian of the Walls, causing the IDF to change many of its values and publish the IDF Spirit. The Lebanese Shia organization Hezbollah has also been a growing threat, against which the IDF fought an asymmetric conflict between 1982 and 2000, as well as a full-scale war in 2006.

Organization

All branches of the IDF answer to a single General Staff. The Chief of the General Staff is the only serving officer having the rank of Lieutenant General (Rav Aluf). He reports directly to the Defense Minister and indirectly to the Prime Minister of Israel and the cabinet. Chiefs of Staff are formally appointed by the cabinet, based on the Defense Minister's recommendation, for three years, but the government can vote to extend their service to four (and on rare occasions even five) years. The current chief of staff is Herzi Halevi. He replaced Aviv Kochavi in 2023.

Structure
The IDF includes the following bodies (those whose respective heads are members of the General Staff are in bold):

Regional commands
 Northern Command
 Central Command
 Southern Command
 Home Front Command

Arms
Ground Arm
 Infantry Corps
 1st Golani Brigade
 35th Paratroopers Brigade
 84th Nahal Brigade
 89th Commando Brigade
 900th Kfir Brigade
 933rd Givati Brigade
 Armored Corps
 7th Sa'ar Armored Brigade
 188th Barak Armored Brigade
 401st Ikvot HaBarzel Armored Brigade
 460th Sons of Light Armored Brigade
 Artillery Corps
 Combat Engineering Corps
 Combat Intelligence Collection Corps

Air and Space Arm
 Air Force
Air Defense Network

Sea Arm
 Israeli Navy

Administrative branches
General Staff
 Planning Directorate (split in 2020)
Multi-Branch Force Buildup Directorate

 Operations Directorate
 IDF Spokesperson
 The Dado Center for Interdisciplinary Military Studies
 Intelligence Directorate
 Intelligence Corps
 Military Censor
 Depth Headquarters
 Manpower Directorate
 Military Police Corps
 Education and Youth Corps
 Adjutant Corps
 General Corps
 Military Rabbinate
 Women's Affairs advisor
 Manpower Planning and Administration brigade
 Individuals' Department
 Staff Department
 Chief Reserve Officer
 Military Courts / Tribunals Unit
 Military Court / Tribunal
 Military Advocate General
 Military Court of Appeals
 Computer Service Directorate
 Teleprocessing and Signal Corps (C4I Corps)
 Technological and Logistics Directorate
 Ordnance Corps
 Maintenance, Supply and Logistics Corps
 Medical Corps

Other bodies
Military:
 Military Academies
 Tactical Command College
 Command and Staff College
 National Security College
 Coordinator of Government Activities in the Territories
 Financial Advisor to the Chief of Staff
 Military Secretary to the Prime Minister
Civilian:
 Director-general of the Ministry of Defense
 Defense Establishment Comptroller Unit
 Administration for the Development of Weapons and the Technological Industry
 Engineering and Construction Department of the Ministry of Defense

Units

Ranks, uniforms and insignia

Ranks 

Unlike most militaries, the IDF uses the same rank names in all corps, including the air force and navy. For ground forces' officers, rank insignia are brass on a red background; for the air force, silver on a blue background; and for the navy, the standard gold worn on the sleeve. Officer insignia are worn on epaulets on top of both shoulders. Insignia distinctive to each service are worn on the cap (see fig. 15).

Enlisted grades wear rank insignia on the sleeve, halfway between the shoulder and the elbow. For the army and air force, the insignia are white with blue interwoven threads backed with the appropriate corps color. Navy personnel wear gold-colored rank insignia sewn on navy blue material.

From the formation of the IDF until the late 1980s, sergeant major was a particularly important warrant officer rank, in line with usage in other armies. However, in the 1980s and 1990s the proliferating ranks of sergeant major became devalued, and now all professional non-commissioned officer ranks are a variation on sergeant major (rav samal) with the exception of rav nagad.

All translations here are the official translations of the IDF's website.

Conscripts (Hogrim) (Conscript ranks may be gained purely on time served)
 Private (Turai)
 Corporal (Rav Turai) (also called rabat)
 Sergeant (Samal)
 First Sergeant (Samal Rishon)

Warrant Officers (Nagadim)
 Sergeant First Class (Rav Samal)
 Master Sergeant (Rav Samal Rishon)
 Sergeant Major (Rav Samal Mitkadem)
 Warrant Officer (Rav Samal Bakhir)
 Master Warrant Officer (Rav Nagad Mishneh)
 Chief Warrant Officer (Rav Nagad)

Academic officers (Ktzinim Akadema'im)
 Professional Academic Officer (Katzin Miktzo'i Akadema'i)
 Senior Academic Officer (Katzin Akadema'i Bakhir)

Officers (Ktzinim)
 Second Lieutenant (Segen Mishneh) [1951–Present]
 Lieutenant (Segen)
 Captain (Seren)
 Major (Rav Seren)
 Lieutenant Colonel (Sgan Aluf)
 Colonel (Aluf Mishneh) [1950–Present]
 Brigadier General (Tat Aluf) [1968–Present]
 Major General (Aluf) [1948–Present]
 Lieutenant General (Rav Aluf)

Uniforms 

The Israel Defense Forces has several types of uniforms:
 Service dress (מדי אלף Madei Alef – Uniform "A") – the everyday uniform, worn by everybody.
 Field dress (מדי ב Madei Bet – Uniform "B") – worn into combat, training, work on base.
The first two resemble each other but the Madei Alef is made of higher quality materials in a golden-olive while the madei bet is in olive drab. The dress uniforms may also exhibit a surface shine
 Officers / Ceremonial dress (מדי שרד madei srad) – worn by officers, or during special events/ceremonies.
 Dress uniform and mess dress – worn only abroad. There are several dress uniforms depending on the season and the branch.

The service uniform for all ground forces personnel is olive green; navy and air force uniforms are beige/tan (also once worn by the ground forces). The uniforms consist of a two-pocket shirt, combat trousers, sweater, jacket or blouse, and shoes or boots. The navy also has an all white dress uniform. The green fatigues are the same for winter and summer and heavy winter gear is issued as needed. Women's dress parallels the men's but may substitute a skirt for the trousers and a blouse for the shirt.

Headgear included a service cap for dress and semi-dress and a field cap or "Kova raful" bush hat worn with fatigues. Many IDF personnel once wore the tembel as a field hat. IDF personnel generally wear berets in lieu of the service cap and there are many beret colors issued to IDF personnel. Paratroopers are issued a maroon beret, Golani brown, Givati purple, Nahal lime green, Kfir camouflage, Combat Engineers gray, navy blue for IDF Naval and dark gray for IDF Air Force personnel. Other beret colors are: black for armored corps, turquoise for artillery personnel; olive drab for infantry; gray for combat engineers. For all other army personnel, except combat units, the beret for men was green and for women, black. Women in the navy wear a black beret with gold insignia. Males in the navy once wore a blue/black beret but replaced it with the US Navy's sailor cap.

In combat uniforms the Orlite helmet has replaced the British Brodie helmet Mark II/Mark III, RAC Mk II modified helmet with chin web jump harness (used by paratroopers and similar to the HSAT Mk II/Mk III paratrooper helmets), US M1 helmet, and French Modèle 1951 helmet – previously worn by Israeli infantry and airborne troops from the late 1940s to the mid-1970s and early 1980s.

Some corps or units have small variations in their uniforms – for instance, military police wear a white belt and police hat, Naval personnel have dress whites for parades, paratroopers are issued a four pocket tunic (yarkit/yerkit) worn untucked with a pistol belt cinched tight around the waist over the shirt. The IDF Air Corps has a dress uniform consisting of a pale blue shirt with dark blue trousers.

Most IDF soldiers are issued black leather combat boots, certain units issue reddish-brown leather boots for historical reasons — the paratroopers, combat medics, Nahal and Kfir Brigades, as well as some Special Forces units (Sayeret Matkal, Oketz, Duvdevan, Maglan, and the Counter-Terror School). Women were also formerly issued sandals, but this practice has ceased.

Insignia 

IDF soldiers have three types of insignia (other than rank insignia) which identify their corps, specific unit, and position.

A pin attached to the beret identifies a soldier's corps. Soldiers serving in staffs above corps level are often identified by the General Corps pin, despite not officially belonging to it, or the pin of a related corps. New recruits undergoing  tironut (basic training) do not have a pin. Beret colors are also often indicative of the soldier's corps, although most non-combat corps do not have their own beret, and sometimes wear the color of the corps to which the post they're stationed in belongs. Individual units are identified by a shoulder tag attached to the left shoulder strap. Most units in the IDF have their own tags, although those that do not, generally use tags identical to their command's tag (corps, directorate, or regional command).

While one cannot always identify the position/job of a soldier, two optional factors help make this identification: an aiguillette attached to the left shoulder strap and shirt pocket, and a pin indicating the soldier's work type (usually given by a professional course). Other pins may indicate the corps or additional courses taken. Finally, an optional battle pin indicates a war that a soldier has fought in.

Service

Military service routes
The military service is held in three different tracks:
 Regular service (שירות חובה): mandatory military service which is held according to the Israeli security service law.
 Permanent service (שירות קבע): military service which is held as part of a contractual agreement between the IDF and the permanent position-holder.
 Reserve service (שירות מילואים): a military service in which citizens are called for active duty of at most a month every year (in accordance with the Reserve Service Law), for training and ongoing military activities and especially for the purpose of increasing the military forces in case of a war.

Sometimes the IDF would also hold pre-military courses (קורס קדם צבאי or קד"צ) for soon-to-be regular service soldiers.

Special service routes

 Shoher (שוחר), a person enrolled in pre-military studies (high school, technical college up to engineering degree, some of the קד"ץ courses) – after completing the twelfth study year will do a two-month boot-camp and, if allowed, enter a program of education to qualify as a practical engineer, with at least two weeks of training following each study year. Successful candidates will continue for an engineering bachelor degree. The Shoher will be enrolled into regular service if he dropped out before finished their P.A. education or in any finishing education stage (after high school, after P.A. or after receiving the bachelor's degree). Another example of a Shoher is a programmer that is under the programming course of School for Computer Professions (abbr. Basmach ). The course usually lasts about six months, and at its peak, the Shoher receives a programmer badge. The Shoher will have the ability to serve in R&D units without having the engineering credentials if an officer finds him as worthy, and could recommend him for the R&D units. R&D units have the option to provide  certificate for few selected personal to allow the person to work on life-saving or flight equipment without having an Eng. license (the certificate is not valid for medical R&D machinery). The certificate is provided by the highest in command in the research field (as an example for the Air Force it is the Chief of Equipment Group).
 Civilian working for the IDF, a civilian working for the military.

The Israeli Manpower Directorate at the Israeli General Staff is the body which coordinates and assembles activities related to the control over human resources and its placement.

Regular service

National military service is mandatory for all Israeli citizens over the age of 18, although Arab (but not Druze) citizens are exempted if they so please, and other exceptions may be made on religious, physical or psychological grounds (see Profile 21). The Tal law, which exempts ultra-Orthodox Jews from service, has been the subject of several court cases as well as considerable legislative controversy.

Until the draft of July 2015, men served three years in the IDF. Men drafted as of July 2015 and later will serve two years and eight months (32 months), with some roles requiring an additional four months of Permanent service. Women serve two years. The IDF women who volunteer for several combat positions often serve for three years, due to the longer period of training. Women in other positions, such as programmers, who also require lengthy training time, may also serve three years.

Many Religious Zionist men (and many Modern Orthodox who make Aliyah) elect to do Hesder, a five-year program envisioned by Rabbi Yehuda Amital which combines Torah learning and military service.

Some distinguished recruits are selected to be trained in order to eventually become members of special forces units. Every brigade in the IDF has its own special force branch.

Career soldiers are paid on average NIS 23,000 a month, fifty times the NIS 460 paid to conscripts.

In 1998–2000, only about 9% of those who refused to serve in the Israeli military were granted exemption.

Permanent service
Permanent service is designed for soldiers who choose to continue serving in the army after their regular service, for a short or long period, and in many cases making the military their career. Permanent service usually begins immediately after the mandatory Regular service period, but there are also soldiers who get released from military at the end of the mandatory Regular service period and who get recruited back to the military as Permanent service soldiers in a later period.

Permanent service is based on a contractual agreement between the IDF and the permanent position holder. The service contract defines how long the soldier's service would be, and towards the end of the contract period a discussion may rise on the extension of the soldier's service duration. Many times, regular service soldiers are required to commit to a permanent service after the mandatory Regular service period, in exchange for assigning them in military positions which require a long training period.

In exchange for the Permanent service, the Permanent service soldiers receive full wages, and when serving for a long period as a permanent service soldier, they are also entitled for a pension from the army. This right is given to the Permanent service soldiers in a relatively early stage of their life in comparison to the rest of the Israeli retirees.

Reserve service

After personnel complete their regular service, they are either granted permanent exemption from military service, or assigned a position in the reserve forces. No distinction is made between the assignment of men or women to reserve service.

The IDF may call up reservists for:
 reserve service of up to one month every three years, until the age of 40 (enlisted) or 45 (officers). Reservists may volunteer after this age, with approval of the Manpower Directorate.
 immediate active duty in wartime.

All Israelis who served in the IDF and are under the age of 40, unless otherwise exempt, are eligible for reserve duty. However, only those who completed at least 20 days of reserve duty within the past three years are considered active reservists.

In most cases, the reserve duty is carried out in the same unit for years, in many cases the same unit as the active service and by the same people. Many soldiers who have served together in active service continue to meet in reserve duty for years after their discharge, causing reserve duty to become a strong male bonding experience in Israeli society.

Although still available for call-up in times of crisis, most Israeli men, and virtually all women, do not actually perform reserve service in any given year. In 2015, only 26% of the population eligible for reserve duty held an active reserve status. The IDF has reduced the number of reserve soldiers called up to improve efficiency and cut costs. Units do not always call up all of their reservists every year, and a variety of exemptions are available if called for regular reserve service. Virtually no exemptions exist for reservists called up in a time of crisis, but experience has shown that in such cases (most recently, the 2014 Operation Protective Edge) exemptions are rarely requested or exercised; units generally achieve recruitment rates above those considered fully manned.

Legislation (approved in April 2008) has reformed the reserve service, lowering the maximum service age to 40 for enlisted, and 45 for officers, designating it as an emergency and security force (disallowing routine duties that may be carried out by the active forces), as well as many other changes to the structure (although the Defense Minister can suspend any portion of it at any time for security reasons). The age threshold for many reservists whose positions are listed and updated yearly by the Knesset through the Occupations executive order is fixed at 45 or 49, depending on their military occupation and position.

Non-IDF service
Other than the civil, i.e. non-military "National Service" (Sherut Leumi), IDF conscripts may serve in bodies other than the IDF in a number of ways.

The combat option is Israel Border Police (Magav – the exact translation from Hebrew means "border guard") service, part of the Israel Police. Some soldiers complete their IDF combat training and later undergo additional counter terror and Border Police training. These are assigned to Border Police units. The Border Police units fight side by side with the regular IDF combat units though to a lower capacity. They are also responsible for security in heavy urban areas such as Jerusalem and security and crime fighting in rural areas.

Women

Israel is one of only a few nations that conscript women or deploy them in combat roles, although in practice, women can avoid conscription through a religious exemption and over a third of Israeli women do so. As of 2010, 88% of all roles in the IDF are open to female candidates, and women could be found in 69% of all IDF positions.

According to the IDF, 535 female Israeli soldiers were killed during service in the period 1962–2016, and dozens before then. The IDF says that fewer than 4 percent of women are in combat positions. Rather, they are concentrated in "combat-support" positions which command a lower compensation and status than combat positions.

Civilian pilot and aeronautical engineer Alice Miller successfully petitioned the High Court of Justice to take the Israeli Air Force pilot training exams, after being rejected on grounds of gender. Though president Ezer Weizman, a former IAF commander, told Miller that she would be better off staying home and darning socks, the court eventually ruled in 1996 that the IAF could not exclude qualified women from pilot training. Even though Miller would not pass the exams, the ruling was a watershed, opening doors for women in new IDF roles. Female legislators took advantage of the momentum to draft a bill allowing women to volunteer for any position, if they could qualify.

In 2000 the Equality amendment to the Military Service law stated that the right of women to serve in any role in the IDF is equal to the right of men. Women have served in the military since before the founding of the state of Israel in 1948. Women started to enter combat support and light combat roles in a few areas, including the Artillery Corps, infantry units and armored divisions. A few platoons named Karakal were formed for men and women to serve together in light infantry. By 2000 Karakal became a full-fledged battalion, with a second mixed-gender battalion, Lions of the Jordan (אריות הירדן, Arayot Ha-Yarden) formed in 2015. Many women also joined the Border Police.

In June 2011 Maj. General Orna Barbivai became the first female major general in the IDF, replacing head of the directorate Maj. General Avi Zamir. Barbivai stated, "I am proud to be the first woman to become a major general and to be part of an organization in which equality is a central principle. Ninety percent of jobs in the IDF are open to women and I am sure that there are other women who will continue to break down barriers."

In 2013 the IDF announced they would, for the first time, allow a (MTF) transgender woman to serve in the army as a female soldier.

Elana Sztokman notes it would be "difficult to claim that women are equals in the IDF". "And tellingly, there is only one female general in the entire IDF," she adds. In 2012 religious soldiers claimed they were promised they would not have to listen to women sing or lecture, but IAF Chief Rabbi Moshe Raved resigned because male religious soldiers were being required to do so. In January 2015 three women IDF singers performed in one of the IDF's units. The performance was first disrupted by fifteen religious soldiers, who left in protest and then the Master Sergeant forced the women to end the performance because it was disturbing the religious soldiers. An IDF spokesperson announced an investigation of the incident: "We are aware of the incident and already began examining it. The exclusion of woman is not consistent with the values of the IDF." Defense Minister Moshe Ya'alon has also arranged for women to be excluded from recruitment centers catering to religious males. As the IDF recruits more religious soldiers, the rights of male religious soldiers and of women in the IDF come into conflict. Brig. Gen. Zeev Lehrer, who served on the chief of staff's panel of the integration of women, noted "There is a clear process of 'religionization' in the army, and the story of the women is a central piece of it. There are very strong pressures at work to halt the process of integrating women into the army, and they are coming from the direction of religion." Sex segregation is allowed in the IDF, which reached what it considers a "new milestone" in 2006, creating the first company of soldiers segregated in an all female unit, the Nachshol (Hebrew for "giant wave") Reconnaissance Company. "We are the only unit in the world made up entirely of female combat soldiers," said Nachshol Company Commander Cpt. Dana Ben-Ezra. "Our effectiveness and the dividends we earn are the factors by which we are measured, not our gender."

Minorities in the IDF
Non-Jewish minorities tended to serve in one of several special units: the Sword Battalion, also known as Unit 300 or the Minorities Unit, until it was disbanded in 2015; the Druze Reconnaissance Unit; and the Trackers Unit, composed mostly of Negev Bedouins. In 1982 the IDF general staff decided to integrate the armed forces by opening up other units to minorities, while placing some Jewish conscripts in the Minorities Unit. Until 1988 the intelligence corps and the air force remained closed to minorities.

Druze and Circassians

Although Israel has a majority of Jewish soldiers, all citizens including large numbers of Druze and Circassian men are subject to mandatory conscription. Originally, they served in the framework of a special unit called "The Minorities' Unit", which operated until 2015 in the form of the independent Herev Gdud ("Sword") battalion. However, since the 1980s Druze soldiers have increasingly protested this practice, which they considered a means of segregating them and denying them access to elite units (like sayeret units). The army has increasingly admitted Druze soldiers to regular combat units and promoted them to higher ranks from which they had been previously excluded. In 2015 Rav Aluf Gadi Eizenkot ordered the unit's closure in order to assimilate the Druze soldiers no differently than Jewish soldiers, as part of an ongoing reorganization of the army. Several Druze officers reached ranks as high as Major General, and many received commendations for distinguished service. In proportion to their numbers, the Druze people achieve much higher—documented—levels in the Israeli army than other soldiers. Nevertheless, some Druze still charge that discrimination continues, such as exclusion from the Air Force, although the official low security classification for Druze has been abolished for some time. The first Druze aircraft navigator completed his training course in 2005; like all air force pilots, his identity is not disclosed. During the 1948 Arab–Israeli War, many Druze who had initially sided with the Arabs deserted their ranks to either return to their villages or side with Israel in various capacities.

Since the late 1970s the Druze Initiative Committee, centered at the village of Beit Jan and linked to Maki, has campaigned to abolish Druze conscription.

Military service is a tradition among some of the Druze population, with most opposition in Druze communities of the Golan Heights; 83 percent of Druze boys serve in the army, according to the IDF's statistics. According to the Israeli army in 2010, 369 Druze soldiers had been killed in combat operations since 1948.

Bedouins and Israeli Arabs

By law, all Israeli citizens are subject to conscription. The Defense Minister has complete discretion to grant exemption to individual citizens or classes of citizens. A long-standing policy dating to Israel's early years extends an exemption to all other Israeli minorities (most notably Israeli Arabs). However, there is a long-standing government policy of encouraging Bedouins to volunteer and of offering them various inducements, and in some impoverished Bedouin communities a military career seems one of the few means of (relative) social mobility available. Also, Muslims and Christians are accepted as volunteers, even if older than 18.

From among non-Bedouin Arab citizens, the number of volunteers for military service—some Christian Arabs and even a few Muslim Arabs—is minute, and the government makes no special effort to increase it. Six Israeli Arabs have received orders of distinction as a result of their military service; of them the most famous is a Bedouin officer, Lieutenant Colonel Abd el-Majid Hidr (also known as Amos Yarkoni), who received the Order of Distinction. Vahid el Huzil was the first Bedouin to be a battalion commander.

Until the second term of Yitzhak Rabin as Prime Minister (1992–1995), social benefits given to families in which at least one member (including a grandfather, uncle, or cousin) had served at some time in the armed forces were significantly higher than to "non-military" families, which was considered a means of blatant discrimination between Jews and Arabs. Rabin led the abolition of the measure, in the teeth of strong opposition from the Right. At present, the only official advantage from military service is the attaining of security clearance and serving in some types of government positions (in most cases, security-related), as well as some indirect benefits.

Rather than perform army service, Israeli Arab youths have the option to volunteer to national service and receive benefits similar to those received by discharged soldiers. The volunteers are generally allocated to Arab populations, where they assist with social and community matters.  1,473 Arabs were volunteering for national service. According to sources in the national service administration, Arab leaders are counseling youths to refrain from performing services to the state. According to a National Service official, "For years the Arab leadership has demanded, justifiably, benefits for Arab youths similar to those received by discharged soldiers. Now, when this opportunity is available, it is precisely these leaders who reject the state's call to come and do the service, and receive these benefits."

Although Arabs are not obliged to serve in IDF, any Arab can volunteer. In 2008 a Muslim Arab woman was serving as a medic with unit 669.

Cpl. Elinor Joseph from Haifa became the first female Arab combat soldier for IDF.

Other Arab-Muslim officers who have served in the IDF are Second Lieutenant Hisham Abu Varia and Major Ala Wahib, the highest ranking Muslim officer in the IDF in 2013.

In October 2012 the IDF promoted Mona Abdo to become the first female Christian Arab to the rank of combat commander. Abdo had voluntarily enlisted in the IDF, which her family had encouraged, and transferred from the Ordnance Corps to the Caracal Battalion, a mixed-gender unit with both Jewish and Arab soldiers.

In 2014 an increase of Israeli Christian Arabs joining the army was reported.

Muslim Arabs have also been drafted into the Israel Defense Forces in increasing numbers in recent years. In 2020, 606 Muslim Arabs were drafted, compared to 489 in 2019 and 436 in 2018. More than half of those who have drafted have gone into combat roles.

Ethiopian Jews
The IDF carried out extended missions in Ethiopia and neighboring states, whose purpose was to protect Ethiopian Jews (Beta Israel) and to help their immigration to Israel. The IDF adopted policies and special activities for absorption and integration of Ethiopian immigrant soldiers, reported to have much improved the achievements and integration of those soldiers in the army, and Israeli society in general. Statistical research showed that the Ethiopian soldiers are esteemed as excellent soldiers and many aspire to be recruited to combat units.

Haredim

Men in the Haredi community may choose to defer service while enrolled in yeshivot (see Tal committee); many avoid conscription altogether. This special arrangement is called Torato Omanuto, and has given rise to tensions between the Israeli religious and secular communities. While options exist for Haredim to serve in the IDF in an atmosphere accommodating to their religious convictions, most Haredim do not choose to serve in the IDF.

Haredi males have the option of serving in the 97th "Netzah Yehuda" Infantry Battalion. This unit is a standard IDF infantry battalion focused on the Jenin region. To facilitate Haredi soldiers to serve, the Netzah Yehuda military bases follow the standards of Jewish dietary laws; the only women permitted on these bases are wives of soldiers and officers. Additionally, some Haredim serve in the IDF via the Hesder system, principally designed for the Religious Zionist sector; it is a 5-year program which includes 2 years of religious studies, 1½ years of military service and 1½ years of religious studies during which the soldiers can be recalled to active duty at any moment. Haredi soldiers may join other units of the IDF, but rarely do.

The IDF has identified a gap of hundreds of soldiers in their technical units that might be filled by the Haredi. The IAF is currently using defense contractors to fill in the gaps and continue operations.

Although the IDF claims it will not discriminate against women, it is offering Haredim "women free and secular free" recruitment centers. Defense Minister Moshe Ya'alon expressed his willingness to relax regulations to meet the demands of ultra-Orthodox rabbis. Regulations regarding gender equality had already been relaxed so that Haredim could be assured that men would not receive physical exams from female medical staff.

LGBT people

Israel is one of 24 nations that allow openly gay individuals to serve in the military. Since the early 1990s, sexual identity presents no formal barrier in terms of soldiers' military specialization or eligibility for promotion.

Until the 1980s the IDF tended to discharge soldiers who were openly gay. In 1983 the IDF permitted homosexuals to serve, but banned them from intelligence and top-secret positions. A decade later, Professor Uzi Even, an IDF reserves officer and chairman of Tel Aviv University's Chemistry Department, revealed that his rank had been revoked and that he had been barred from researching sensitive topics in military intelligence, solely because of his sexual orientation. His testimony to the Knesset in 1993 raised a political storm, forcing the IDF to remove such restrictions against gays.

The chief of staff's policy states that it is strictly forbidden to harm or hurt anyone's dignity or feeling based on their gender or sexual orientation in any way, including signs, slogans, pictures, poems, lectures, any means of guidance, propaganda, publishing, voicing, and utterance. Moreover, gays in the IDF have additional rights, such as the right to take a shower alone if they want to. According to a University of California, Santa Barbara study, a brigadier general stated that Israelis show a "great tolerance" for gay soldiers. Consul David Saranga at the Israeli Consulate in New York, who was interviewed by the St. Petersburg Times, said, "It's a non-issue. You can be a very good officer, a creative one, a brave one, and be gay at the same time."

A study published by the Israel Gay Youth (IGY) Movement in January 2012 found that half of the homosexual soldiers who serve in the IDF suffer from violence and homophobia, although the head of the group said that "I am happy to say that the intention among the top brass is to change that."

Deaf and hard-of-hearing people
Israel is the only country in the world that requires deaf and hard-of-hearing people to serve in the military. Sign language interpreters are provided during training, and many of them serve in non-combat capacities such as mapping and office work. The major language spoken by deaf in Israel is Israeli Sign Language (also called Shassi)–a language related to German Sign Language but not Hebrew or any other local language–though Israel and Palestine are home to numerous sign languages spoken by various populations like Bedouins' Al-Sayyid Bedouin Sign Language.

Vegans
According to a Care2 report, vegans in the IDF may refuse vaccination if they oppose animal testing. They are given artificial leather boots and a black fleece beret. Until 2014, vegan soldiers in the IDF received special allowances to buy their own food, when this policy was replaced with vegan food being provided in all bases, as well as vegan combat rations being offered to vegan combat soldiers.

Volunteers
In cases when a citizen cannot be normally drafted by the law (old age, served as a soldier in a different country, severe health problems, handicaps, autism, etc.), the person could enroll as a volunteer in places where his knowledge can be used or in cases where there is a base that accepts volunteer service from one day per week up to full-time service based upon a volunteer's abilities and wishes.

Overseas volunteers
Non-immigrating foreign volunteers typically serve with the IDF in one of five ways:
 The Mahal program targets young non-Israeli Jews or Israeli citizens who grew up abroad (men younger than 24 and women younger than 21). The program consists typically of 18 months of IDF service, including a lengthy training for those in combat units or (for 18 months) one month of non-combat training and additional two months of learning Hebrew after enlisting, if necessary. There are two additional subcategories of Mahal, both geared solely for religious men: Mahal Nahal Haredi (18 months), and Mahal Hesder, which combines yeshiva study of 5 months with IDF service of 16 months, for a total of 21 months. Similar IDF programs exist for Israeli overseas residents. To be accepted as a Mahal Volunteer, one must be of Jewish descent (at least one Jewish grandparent).
 Sar-El, an organization subordinate to the Israeli Logistics Corps, provides a volunteer program for non-Israeli citizens who are 17 years or older (or 15 if accompanied by a parent). The program is also aimed at Israeli citizens, aged 30 years or older, living abroad who did not serve in the Israeli Army and who now wish to finalize their status with the military. The program usually consists of three weeks of volunteer service on different rear army bases, doing non-combative work.
 Garin Tzabar offers a program mainly for Israelis who emigrated with their parents to the United States at a young age. Although a basic knowledge of the Hebrew language is not mandatory, it is helpful. Of all the programs listed, only Garin Tzabar requires full-length service in the IDF. The program is set up in stages: first the participants go through five seminars in their country of origin, then have an absorption period in Israel at a kibbutz. Each delegation is adopted by a kibbutz in Israel and has living quarters designated for it. The delegation shares responsibilities in the kibbutz when on military leave. Participants start the program three months before being enlisted in the army at the beginning of August.
 Marva is short-term basic training for two months.
 Lev LaChayal is a program based at Yeshivat Lev Hatorah which takes a holistic approach to preparation for service. Being as ready as possible for integrating into Israeli culture, handling the physical challenges of the military, and maintaining religious values require a multi-pronged approach. The beit midrash learning, classes, physical training, and even the recreational activities are designed to allow for maximum readiness.

Mission

The IDF's mission is to "defend the existence, territorial integrity and sovereignty of the state of Israel. To protect the inhabitants of Israel and to combat all forms of terrorism which threaten the daily life." The Israeli military's primary principles derive from Israel's need to combat numerically superior opponents. One such principle, is the concept that Israel cannot afford to lose a single war. The IDF believes that this is possible if it can rapidly mobilize troops to insure that they engage the enemy in enemy territory. In the 21st Century, various nonconventional threats including terrorist organizations, subterranean infrastructure operated by Hamas, etc. have forced the IDF to modify its official defense doctrine.

Doctrine

Main doctrine
The main doctrine consists of the following principles:

Basic points
 Israel cannot afford to lose a single war
 Defensive on the strategic level, no territorial ambitions
 Desire to avoid war by political means and a credible deterrent posture
 Preventing escalation
 Determine the outcome of war quickly and decisively
 Combating terrorism
 Very low casualty ratio

Prepare for defense
 A small standing army with an early warning capability, regular air force and navy
 An efficient reserve mobilization and transportation system

Move to counterattack
 Multi-arm coordination
 Transferring the battle to enemy territory quickly
 Quick attainment of war objectives

Code of conduct
In 1992, the IDF drafted a Code of Conduct that combines international law, Israeli law, Jewish heritage and the IDF's own traditional ethical code—the IDF Spirit (Ru'ah Tzahal).

Stated values of the IDF

The document defines four core values for all IDF soldiers to follow, as well as ten secondary values (the first being most important, and the others appearing sorted in Hebrew alphabetical order):

Core values
 Defense of the State, its Citizens and its Residents
 Love of the Homeland and Loyalty to the Country
 Human Dignity
 Stateliness

Other values

 Tenacity of Purpose in Performing Missions and Drive to Victory
 Responsibility
 Credibility
 Personal Example
 Human Life
 Purity of Arms
 Professionalism
 Discipline
 Comradeship
 Sense of Mission

Military ethics of fighting terror

In 2005, Asa Kasher and Amos Yadlin co-authored a noticed article published in the Journal of Military Ethics under the title: "Military Ethics of Fighting Terror: An Israeli Perspective". The article was meant as an "extension of the classical Just War Theory", and as a "[needed] third model" or missing paradigm besides which of "classical war (army) and law enforcement (police).", resulting in a "doctrine (...) on the background of the IDF fight against acts and activities of terror performed by Palestinian individuals and organizations."

In this article, Kasher and Yadlin came to the conclusion that targeted killings of terrorists were justifiable, even at the cost of hitting nearby civilians. In a 2009 interview to Haaretz, Asa Kasher later confirmed, pointing to the fact that in an area in which the IDF does not have effective security control (e.g., Gaza, vs. East-Jerusalem), soldiers' lives protection takes priority over avoiding injury to enemy civilians. Some, along with Avishai Margalit and Michael Walzer, have recused this argument, advancing that such position was "contrary to centuries of theorizing about the morality of war as well as international humanitarian law", since drawing "a sharp line between combatants and noncombatants" would be "the only morally relevant distinction that all those involved in a war can agree on."

As of today "The Spirit of the IDF" (cf. supra) is still considered the only binding moral code that formally applies to the IDF troops. In 2009, Amos Yadlin (then head of Military Intelligence) suggested that the article he co-authored with Asa Kasher be ratified as a formal binding code, arguing that "the current code ['The Spirit of the IDF'] does not sufficiently address one of the army's most pressing challenges: asymmetric warfare against terrorist organizations that operate amid a civilian population".

Budget
During 1950–66, Israel spent an average of 9% of its GDP on defense. Defense expenditures increased dramatically after both the 1967 and 1973 wars. They reached a high of about 30% of GDP in 1975, but have since come down significantly, following the signing of peace agreements with Jordan and Egypt.

On 30 September 2009 Defense Minister Ehud Barak, Finance Minister Yuval Steinitz and Prime Minister Benjamin Netanyahu endorsed an additional NIS 1.5 billion for the defense budget to help Israel address problems regarding Iran. The budget changes came two months after Israel had approved its current two-year budget. The defense budget in 2009 stood at NIS 48.6 billion and NIS 53.2 billion for 2010 – the highest amount in Israel's history. The figure constituted 6.3% of expected gross domestic product and 15.1% of the overall budget, even before the planned NIS 1.5 billion addition.

However, in 2011, the prime minister Benjamin Netanyahu reversed course and moved to make significant cuts in the defense budget in order to pay for social programs. The General Staff concluded that the proposed cuts endangered the battle readiness of the armed forces. In 2012, Israel spent $15.2 billion on its armed forces, one of the highest ratios of defense spending to GDP among developed countries ($1,900 per person). However, Israel's spending per capita is below that of the US.

Field rations
Field rations, called manot krav, usually consist of canned tuna, sardines, beans, stuffed vine leaves, maize and fruit cocktail and bars of halva.  Packets of fruit flavored drink powder are also provided along with condiments like ketchup, mustard, chocolate spread and jam. Around 2010, the IDF announced that certain freeze dried MREs served in water activated disposable heaters like goulash, turkey schwarma and meatballs would be introduced as field rations.

One staple of these rations was loof, a type of Kosher spam made from chicken or beef that was phased out around 2008. Food historian Gil Marks has written that: "Many Israeli soldiers insist that Loof uses all the parts of the cow that the hot dog manufacturers will not accept, but no one outside of the manufacturer and the kosher supervisors actually know what is inside."

Weapons and equipment

Military equipment
The IDF possesses various foreign and domestically produced weapons and computer systems. Some gear comes from the US (with some equipment modified for IDF use) such as the M4A1 and M16 assault rifles, the M24 SWS 7.62 mm bolt action sniper rifle, the SR-25 7.62 mm semi-automatic sniper rifle, the F-15 Eagle and F-16 Fighting Falcon fighter jets, and the AH-1 Cobra and AH-64D Apache attack helicopters. Israel has also developed its own independent weapons industry, which has developed weapons and vehicles such as the Merkava battle tank series, Nesher and Kfir fighter aircraft, and various small arms such as the Galil and Tavor assault rifles, and the Uzi submachine gun. Israel has also installed a variant of the Samson RCWS, a remote controlled weapons platform, which can include machine guns, grenade launchers, and anti-tank missiles on a remotely operated turret, in pillboxes along the Israeli Gaza Strip barrier intended to prevent Palestinian militants from entering its territory. Israel has developed observation balloons equipped with sophisticated cameras and surveillance systems used to thwart terror attacks from Gaza. The IDF also possesses advanced combat engineering equipment which include the IDF Caterpillar D9 armored bulldozer, IDF Puma CEV, Tzefa Shiryon and CARPET minefield breaching rockets, and a variety of robots and explosive devices.

The IDF also has several large internal research and development departments, and it purchases many technologies produced by the Israeli security industries including IAI, IMI, Elbit Systems, Rafael, and dozens of smaller firms. Many of these developments have been battle-tested in Israel's numerous military engagements, making the relationship mutually beneficial, the IDF getting tailor-made solutions and the industries a good reputation.

In response to the price overruns on the US Littoral Combat Ship program, Israel is considering producing their own warships, which would take a decade and depend on diverting US financing to the project.

Main developments

Israel's military technology is most famous for its firearms, armored fighting vehicles (tanks, tank-converted armored personnel carriers (APCs), armored bulldozers, etc.), unmanned aerial vehicles, and rocketry (missiles and rockets). Israel also has manufactured aircraft including the Kfir (reserve), IAI Lavi (canceled), and the IAI Phalcon Airborne early warning System, and naval systems (patrol and missile ships). Much of the IDF's electronic systems (intelligence, communication, command and control, navigation etc.) are Israeli-developed, including many systems installed on foreign platforms (esp. aircraft, tanks and submarines), as are many of its precision-guided munitions. Israel is the world's largest exporter of drones.

Israel Military Industries (IMI) is known for its firearms. The IMI Galil, the Uzi, the IMI Negev light machine gun and the new Tavor TAR-21 Bullpup assault rifle are used by the IDF. The Rafael Advanced Defense Systems Spike missile is one of the most widely exported ATGMs in the world.

Israel is the only country in the world with an operational anti-ballistic missile defense system on the national level – the Arrow system, jointly funded and produced by Israel and the United States. The Iron Dome system against short-range rockets is operational and proved to be successful, intercepting hundreds of Qassam, 122 mm Grad and Fajr-5 artillery rockets fire by Palestinian militants from the Gaza Strip. David's Sling, an anti-missile system designed to counter medium range rockets, became operational in 2017. Israel has also worked with the US on development of a tactical high energy laser system against medium range rockets (called Nautilus or THEL).

Israel has the independent capability of launching reconnaissance satellites into orbit, a capability shared with Russia, the United States, the United Kingdom, France, South Korea, Italy, Germany, the People's Republic of China, India, Japan, Brazil and Ukraine. Israeli security industries developed both the satellites (Ofeq) and the launchers (Shavit).

Israel is known to have developed nuclear weapons. Israel does not officially acknowledge its nuclear weapons program. It is thought Israel possesses between one hundred and four hundred nuclear warheads. It is believed that Jericho intercontinental ballistic missiles are capable of delivering nuclear warheads with a superior degree of accuracy and a range of 11,500 km. Israeli F-15I and F-16 fighter-bomber aircraft also have been cited as possible nuclear delivery systems (these aircraft types are nuclear capable in the US Air Force). The U.S. Air Force F-15E has tactical nuclear weapon (B61 and B83 bombs) capability. It has been asserted that Dolphin-class submarines have been adapted to carry Popeye Turbo Submarine-launched cruise missiles with nuclear warheads, so as to give Israel a second strike capacity.

From 2006 Israel deployed the Wolf Armoured Vehicle APC for use in urban warfare and to protect VIPs.

Commemoration

Commemoration

Yom Hazikaron, Israel's day of remembrance for fallen soldiers, is observed on the 4th day of the month of Iyar of the Hebrew calendar, the day before the celebration of Independence Day. Memorial services are held in the presence of Israel's top military personnel. A two-minute siren is heard at 11:00, which marks the opening of the official military memorial ceremonies and private remembrance gatherings at each cemetery where soldiers are buried. Many Israelis visit the graves of family members and friends who were killed in action. On the evening before the remembrance day all shops, restaurants and entertainment places must close gates to the public no later than 7 P.M. (the same routine and law applies to the day of remembrance of the Holocaust which takes place a week earlier).

The main museum for Israel's armored corps is the Yad La-Shiryon in Latrun, which houses one of the largest tank museums in the world. Other significant military museums are the Israel Defense Forces History Museum (Batei Ha-Osef) in Tel Aviv, the Palmach Museum, and the Beit HaTotchan of artillery in Zikhron Ya'akov. The Israeli Air Force Museum is located at Hatzerim Airbase in the Negev Desert, and the Israeli Clandestine Immigration and Naval Museum, is in Haifa.

Israel's National Military Cemetery is at Mount Herzl. Other Israeli military cemeteries include Kiryat Shaul Military Cemetery in Tel Aviv, and Sgula military cemetery at Petah Tikva.

Parades

Israel Defense Forces parades took place on Independence Day, during the first 25 years of the State of Israel's existence. They were canceled after 1973 due to financial and security concerns. The Israel Defense Forces still has weapon exhibitions country-wide on Independence Day, but they are stationary.

Foreign military relations

France
Starting on Independence Day on 14 May 1948 (5 Iyar 5708), a strong military, commercial and political relationship were established between France and Israel until 1969. The highest level of the military collaboration was reached between 1956 and 1966. At this time France provided almost all the aircraft, tanks and military ships. In 1969 the French president Charles de Gaulle limited the export of weapons to Israel. This was the end of the "golden age" 20 years of relations between Israel and France.

United States

In 1983, the United States and Israel established a Joint Political Military Group, which convenes twice a year. Both the U.S. and Israel participate in joint military planning and combined exercises, and have collaborated on military research and weapons development. Additionally the U.S. military maintains two classified, pre-positioned War Reserve Stocks in Israel valued at $493 million. Israel has the official distinction of being an American Major non-NATO ally.
Since 1976, Israel had been the largest annual recipient of U.S. foreign assistance. In 2009, Israel received $2.55 billion in Foreign Military Financing (FMF) grants from the Department of Defense. All but 26% of this military aid is for the purchase of military hardware from American companies only.

In October 2012, United States and Israel began their biggest joint air and missile defense exercise, known as Austere Challenge 12, involving around 3,500 U.S. troops in the region along with 1,000 IDF personnel. Germany and Britain also participated.

Since mid 2017, the United States operates an anti-missile system in the Negev region of Southern Israel, which is manned by 120 US Army personnel. It is a facility used by the U.S. inside a larger Mashabim Israeli Air Force base.

India

India and Israel enjoy strong military and strategic ties. Israeli authorities consider Indian citizens to be the most pro-Israel people in the world. Apart from being Israel's second-largest economic partner in Asia, India is also the largest customer of Israeli arms in the world. In 2006, annual military sales between India and Israel stood at US$900 million. Israeli defense firms had the largest exhibition at the 2009 Aero India show, during which Israel offered several state-of-the art weapons to India. The first major military deal between the two countries was the sale of Israeli Phalcon airborne warning and control system (AWACS) radars to the Indian Air Force in 2004. In March 2009, India and Israel signed a US$1.4 billion deal under which Israel would sell India an advanced air-defense system. India and Israel have also embarked on extensive space cooperation. In 2008, India's ISRO launched Israel's most technologically advanced spy satellite TecSAR. In 2009, India reportedly developed a high-tech spy satellite RISAT-2 with significant assistance from Israel. The satellite was successfully launched by India in April 2009.

According to a Los Angeles Times news story the 2008 Mumbai attacks were an attack on the growing India-Israel partnership. It quotes retired Indian Vice Admiral Premvir S. Das thus "Their aim was to... tell the Indians clearly that your growing linkage with Israel is not what you should be doing..." In the past, India and Israel have held numerous joint anti-terror training exercises

Germany

Germany developed the Dolphin submarine and supplied it to Israel. Two submarines were donated by Germany. The military co-operation has been discreet but mutually profitable: Israeli intelligence, for example, sent captured Warsaw Pact armor to West Germany to be analyzed. The results aided the German development of an anti-tank system. Israel also trained members of GSG 9, a German counter-terrorism and special operations unit. The Israeli Merkava MK IV tank uses a German V12 engine produced under license.

In 2008, the website DefenseNews revealed that Germany and Israel had been jointly developing a nuclear warning system, dubbed Operation Bluebird.

United Kingdom

During a secret operation in 1966, two British made "Chieftain" MBTs were brought to Israel for a 4 years long evaluation for service with the IDF. The plan was for the IDF not only to purchase the British MBTs, but for IMI (Israeli Military Industries) to buy production rights. As part of the deal during the early 60's Israel purchased second hand "Centurion" MBTs from the British, that used that money in the "Chieftain" development. After the trials were done Israeli improvement and ideas were implemented by the British manufacturer, but British politicians canceled the agreement with Israel and the program was shut down. The knowledge earned during the improvements on the "Chieftain", together with earlier experiments in tank improvements, gave the last push for the development and production of the "Merkava" tank.

United Kingdom has supplied equipment and spare parts for Sa'ar 4.5-class missile boats and F-4 Phantom fighter-bombers, components for small-caliber artillery ammunition and air-to-surface missiles, and engines for Elbit Hermes 450 Unmanned aerial vehicles. British arms sales to Israel mainly consist of light weaponry, and ammunition and components for helicopters, tanks, armored personnel carriers, and combat aircraft.

Russia

On 19 October 1999, Defense Minister of China, General Chi Haotian, after meeting with Syrian Defense Minister Mustafa Tlass in Damascus, Syria, to discuss expanding military ties between Syria and China, then flew directly to Israel and met with Ehud Barak, the then Prime Minister and Defense Minister of Israel where they discussed military relations. Among the military arrangements was a $1 billion Israeli Russian sale of military aircraft to China, which were to be jointly produced by Russia and Israel.

Russia has bought drones from Israel.

China

Israel is the second-largest foreign supplier of arms to the People's Republic of China, only after the Russian Federation. China has purchased a wide array of military hardware from Israel, including Unmanned aerial vehicles and communications satellites. China has become an extensive market for Israel's military industries and arms manufacturers, and trade with Israel has allowed it to obtain "dual-use" technology which the United States and European Union were reluctant to provide. In 2010 Yair Golan, head of IDF Home Front Command visited China to strengthen military ties. In 2012, IDF Chief of Staff Benny Gantz visited China for high-level talks with the Chinese defense establishment.

Cyprus

As closely neighboring countries, Israel and Cyprus have enjoyed greatly improving diplomatic relations since 2010. During the Mount Carmel Forest Fire, Cyprus dispatched two aviation assets to assist fire-fighting operations in Israel – the first time Cypriot Government aircraft were permitted to operate from Israeli airfields in a non-civil capacity. In addition, Israel and Cyprus have closely cooperated in maritime activities relating to Gaza, since 2010, and have reportedly begun an extensive sharing program of regional intelligence to support mutual security concerns. On 17 May 2012, it was widely reported that the Israeli Air Force had been granted unrestricted access to the Nicosia Flight Information Region of Cyprus, and that Israeli aviation assets may have operated over the island itself. Cyprus, as a former S-300 air-defense system operator, was speculated by Greek media to have assisted Israel in strategic planning to challenge such air-defense systems, alongside shorter-range SAM systems, although this remains unconfirmed.

Greece

Israel and Greece have enjoyed a very cordial military relationship since 2008, including military drills ranging from Israel to the island of Crete. Drills include air-to-air long-distance refueling, long-range flights, and most importantly aiding Israel in outmaneuvering the S-300 which Greece has. Recent purchases include 100 million euro deal between Greece and Israel for the purchase of SPICE 1000 and SPICE 2000 pound bomb kits. They have also signed many defense agreements, including Cyprus, in order to establish stability for transporting gas from Israel-Cyprus to Greece and on to the European Union-a paramount objective to the future stability and prosperity of all three countries, threatened by Turkey.

Turkey

Israel has provided extensive military assistance to Turkey. Israel sold Turkey IAI Heron Unmanned aerial vehicles, and modernized Turkey's F-4 Phantom and Northrop F-5 aircraft at the cost of $900 million. Turkey's main battle tank is the Israeli-made Sabra tank, of which Turkey has 170. Israel later upgraded them for $500 million. Israel has also supplied Turkey with Israeli-made missiles, and the two nations have engaged in naval cooperation. Turkey allowed Israeli pilots to practice long-range flying over mountainous terrain in Turkey's Konya firing range, while Israel trains Turkish pilots at Israel's computerized firing range at Nevatim Airbase. Until 2009, the Turkish military was one of Israel's largest defense customers. Israel defense companies have sold unmanned aerial vehicles and long-range targeting pods.

However, relations have been strained in recent times. In the last two years, the Turkish military has declined to participate in the annual joint naval exercise with Israel and the United States. The exercise, known as "Reliant Mermaid" was started in 1998 and included the Israeli, Turkish and American navies. The objective of the exercise is to practice search-and-rescue operations and to familiarize each navy with international partners who also operate in the Mediterranean Sea.

Azerbaijan

Azerbaijan and Israel have engaged in intense cooperation since 1992. Israeli military have been a major provider of battlefield aviation, artillery, antitank, and anti-infantry weaponry to Azerbaijan. In 2009, Israeli President Shimon Peres made a visit to Azerbaijan where military relations were expanded further, with the Israeli company Aeronautics Defense Systems Ltd announcing it was going to build a factory in Baku. In 2012, Israel and Azerbaijan signed an agreement according to which state-run Israel Aerospace Industries would sell $1.6 billion in drones and anti-aircraft and missile defense systems to Azerbaijan.

Other countries
Israel has also sold to or received supplies of military equipment from the Czech Republic, Argentina, Portugal, Spain, Slovakia, Italy, South Africa, Canada, Australia, Poland, Slovenia, Romania, Hungary, Belgium, Austria, Serbia, Montenegro, Bosnia and Herzegovina, Georgia, Vietnam and Colombia, among others.

Future

The IDF is planning a number of technological upgrades and structural reforms for the future for its land, air, and sea branches. Training has been increased, including in cooperation between ground, air, and naval units.

The Israeli Army is phasing out the M-16 rifle from all ground units in favor of the IMI Tavor variants, most recently the IWI Tavor X95 flat-top ("Micro-Tavor Dor Gimel"). In addition, the IDF is now replacing its outdated M113 armored personnel carriers in favor of new Namer APCs, with 200 ordered in 2014, the Eitan AFV, and is upgrading its IDF Achzarit APCs. The IDF also announced plans to streamline its military bureaucracy so as to better maintain its reserve force, which a 2014 State Comptroller report noted was under-trained and may not be able to fulfill wartime missions. As part of the plans, 100,000 reservists and will be discharged, and training for the remainder will be improved. The officer corps will be slashed by 5,000. In addition, infantry and light artillery brigades will be reduced to increase training standards among the rest. The backbone of the IDF Artillery Corps, the M109 howitzer, will be phased out in favor of a still-undecided replacement, with the ATMOS 2000 and Artillery Gun Module under primary consideration. The IDF is also planning a future tank to replace the Merkava. The new tank will be able to fire lasers and electromagnetic pulses, run on a hybrid engine, run with a crew as small as two, will be faster, and will be better-protected, with emphasis on protection systems such as the Trophy over armor. The Combat Engineering Corps assimilated new technologies, mainly in tunnel detection and unmanned ground vehicles and military robots, such as remote-controlled IDF Caterpillar D9T "Panda" armored bulldozers, Sahar engineering scout robot and improved Remotec ANDROS robots.

The Israeli Air Force will purchase as many as 100 F-35 Lightning II fighter jets from the United States. The aircraft will be modified and designated F-35I. They will use Israeli-built electronic warfare systems, outer-wings, guided bombs, and air-to-air missiles. As part of a 2013 arms deal, the IAF will purchase KC-135 Stratotanker aerial refueling aircraft and V-22 Osprey multi-mission aircraft from the United States, as well as advanced radars for warplanes and missiles designed to take out radars. In April 2013, an Israeli official stated that within 40–50 years, piloted aircraft would be phased out of service by unmanned aerial vehicles capable of executing nearly any operation that can be performed by piloted combat aircraft. Israel's military industries are reportedly on the path to developing such technology in a few decades. Israel will also manufacture tactical satellites for military use.

The Israeli Navy is currently expanding its submarine fleet, with a planned total of six Dolphin class submarines. Currently, five have been delivered, with the sixth, INS Drakon, expected to be delivered in 2020. It is also upgrading and expanding its surface fleet. It is planning to upgrade the electronic warfare systems of its Sa'ar 5-class corvettes and Sa'ar 4.5 class missile boats, and has ordered two new classes of warship: the Sa'ar 6-class corvette (a variant of the Braunschweig-class corvette) and the Sa'ar 72-class corvette (an improved and enlarged version of the Sa'ar 4.5-class). It plans to acquire four Saar 6-class corvettes and three Sa'ar 72-class corvettes. Israel is also developing marine artillery, including a gun capable of firing satellite-guided 155mm rounds between 75 and 120 kilometers.

See also

Security forces 
 Intelligence Community
 Shabak
 Mossad
 National Security Council
 Israeli police
 Knesset Guard

Defense industry of Israel 
 Defense industry of Israel
 Plasan
 Soltam

Strategic communication
 IDF Spokesperson's Unit
 Public diplomacy of Israel

Related subjects

 Arab–Israeli conflict
 Israel and weapons of mass destruction
 Israeli casualties of war
 Krav Maga
 List of brigades of the Israel Defense Forces
 Military equipment of Israel
 Military history of Israel
 Palestinian political violence
 Prayer for the IDF
 Sherut Leumi, the non-military (civil) national service

References and footnotes

Further reading
 Marcus, Raphael D.  Israel's Long War with Hezbollah: Military Innovation and Adaptation under Fire (Georgetown UP, 2018) online review
 
 
 
 
 
 Roislien, Hanne Eggen (2013). "Religion and Military Conscription: The Case of the Israeli Defense Forces (IDF)," Armed Forces & Society 39, No. 3, pp. 213–232.
 Country Briefing: Israel, Jane's Defence Weekly, 19 June 1996

External links

 
 Israel Defense Forces ranks and insignia
 IDF Blog – news and updates from the field
 IDF Code of Conduct
 Moshe Yaalon, The IDF and the Israeli Spirit
 The IDF Spirit – the ethical code of the IDF
 Palestinian violence and terror attacks since September 2000
 A list of civilians and soldiers who died during Palestinian terror attacks since September 2000
 CNN.com Special – Victims of Terror
 isayeret.com – The Israeli Special Forces Database
 Israeli Weapons
 Original Letters and Manuscripts: Ben-Gurion on the IDF Shapell Manuscript Foundation
 Jerusalem volunteer Border Guard
 Tsahal-Miniature 
 Israeli Armed Forces at Flags of the World
 IDF photos
 Israel's War History
 Israel Military Forum
 

 
1948 establishments in Israel
Military units and formations established in 1948
Israel Prize in education recipients
Israel Prize recipients that are organizations